Hankiz Omar, better known as Hanikezi, is a Chinese actress, dancer and model of Uyghur ethnicity, who first rose to prominence in 2018 for participating in IQIYI's show The Chinese Youth.

Early life 
Hanikezi was born on January 29, 1996, to a Uyghur family in Ürümqi, Xinjiang. Her name, Hankiz, means "leader among women" in Uyghur language. After graduating from high school, she joined a PLA military arts troupe for two years as an actress while studying at the Xinjiang Arts Institute.

Career 
In 2018, Hanikezi was discovered and signed by Beijing-based Mountain Top Entertainment, and thus officially started her acting career. In October, Hanikezi participated in IQIYI's The Chinese Youth (國風美少年). Although she was eventually eliminated from the show, she gained popularity and attention nationwide thanks to her performance of "A Dream of Dunhuang".

On January 1, 2019, Hanikezi participated in CCTV's New Year's Party, where she and Kazakhstani singer Dimash Kudaibergen performed the song "Mo Li Hua". She then took part in Hunan TV's Spring Festival Gala and performed group dance "The Silk Road" with several other artists.

In 2020, Hanikezi was cast as one of the leading role in the historical drama Dance of the Sky Empire. Later that year, she took part in various projects such as Song of Youth, Ancient Love Poetry, Ultimate Note, and the costume fantasy film Soul Snatcher.

Filmography

Television series

Film

References

External links 
 

1996 births
Living people
Actresses from Xinjiang
Uyghur people
Chinese television actresses
Chinese female models
Chinese female dancers
21st-century Chinese actresses
People from Ürümqi
Chinese film actresses